Ruturaj Dashrat Gaikwad (born 31 January 1997) is an Indian international cricketer who plays for Maharashtra in domestic cricket and for the Chennai Super Kings in the Indian Premier League (IPL). He made his international debut for the India cricket team in July 2021 against Srilanka. He was the leading run-scorer in the 2021 Indian Premier League tournament. He is captaining Maharashtra in T20 and List A since the 2021 Mushtaq Ali Trophy and Vijay Hazare Trophy. He led Maharashtra to the Vijay Hazare Trophy final in 2022.

Early life
Ruturaj Gaikwad is from Pune, Maharashtra. His father is Dashrath Gaikwad, who was a Defence Research Development Organisation's (DRDO) employee. His mother Sawita Gaikwad is a teacher in a municipality school. According to Gaikwad his parents never insisted him to study more and play less Cricket. Gaikwad's native village is Pargaon Memane village in Saswad area of Pune district, Maharastra.

He did his primary schooling from St. Joseph school. He studied in Lakashmi bai Nadgude school of Pimpri Nilakh in Pune. He did college studies from Marathvada Mitra Mandal's college.

Domestic career

Early career 
Gaikwad at the age of 13 joined the Pimpri Chinchwad Municipal Corporation's (PCMC) Varroc Dilip Vengsarkar Academy' in Thergaon in Pimpri Chinchwad, Pune.

In Cadence trophy of 2010, He scored 63* (71) against Mumbai's MIG Cricket club for Varroc Vengsarkar Academy, he got man of the match. His academy beat MIG Cricket club by 7 wickets, Cadence Cricket ground.

At Maharashtra invitational tournament of 2015, he scored 306 runs in a match in partnership of 522 runs with his teammate Vinay.

Debut for Maharashtra 
He made his first-class debut for Maharashtra in the 2016–17 Ranji Trophy on 6 October 2016. He made his Twenty20 debut for Maharashtra in the 2016–17 Inter State Twenty-20 Tournament on 2 February 2017. In the 2019 Ranji trophy season, he scored 108 (199) in first inning and 76 (170) in Pune in second inning, while opening for Maharashtra Cricket team versus Chhattisgarh. He became man of the match in this match. He made his List A debut for Maharashtra in the 2016–17 Vijay Hazare Trophy on 25 February 2017. In this tournament he scored 444 runs along 63.42 average in 7 matches. He scored 3 half centuries and one century. He was the third highest run getter in 2016–17 Vijay Hazare trophy.

In Indian domestic cricket structure he played for India A, India B, India Blue, Maharashtra and India U-23. In October 2018, Gaikwad was named in India B's squad for the 2018–19 Deodhar Trophy. In December 2018, he was named in India's team for the 2018 ACC Emerging Teams Asia Cup.

He scored four centuries in four matches in Mandke trophy of 2019.

In June 2019, he scored 187 not out for India A against Sri Lanka A. In August 2019, he was named in the India Blue team's squad for the 2019–20 Duleep Trophy. In October 2019, he was named in India B's squad for the 2019–20 Deodhar Trophy. 

In the 2021 Mushtaq Ali trophy, Gaikwad captained Maharashtra and scored 259 runs in five matches at an average of 51.80, including three fifties at a strike rate of 150.71. He finished as one of the top scorers in the tournament. in the 2021–22 Vijay Hazare trophy he scored four hundreds and equaled Virat Kohli's record of scoring maximum hundreds in single Vijay Hazare tournament and scored over 600 runs in the tournament for Maharashtra.

In November 2022, during 2nd quarter-final match between Maharashtra and Uttar Pardesh of 2022–23 Vijay Hazare Trophy, Gaikwad became the first batter to hit seven sixes in an over (one off a no-ball) in all forms of cricket. With the 108-run knock against Saurashtra ( In the Final of Vijay Hazare Trophy 2022-23), Gaikwad now owns the record for the most centuries by any player in Vijay Hazare Trophy history (12). Former Indian cricketer Robin Uthappa and Gaikwad's current Maharashtra teammate Ankit Bawne jointly held the record previously (11 centuries each).

International career
In June 2021, Gaikwad was named in India's One Day International (ODI) and Twenty20 International (T20I) squads for their series against Sri Lanka. He made his T20I debut on 28 July 2021, for India against Sri Lanka. In December 2021, Gaikwad was named in India's ODI squad for their series against South Africa. In January 2022, Gaikwad was again named in India's ODI squad, this time for their home series against the West Indies. In June 2022, he scored his maiden T20I half-century against South Africa.

In July 2022, he was named in India's ODI squad for their away series against the West Indies. In October 2022, he was named in India's ODI squad, for their series against South Africa. He made his ODI debut on 6 October 2022 against the South Africa.

Indian Premier League
In December 2018, Gaikwad was bought by the Chennai Super Kings (CSK) in the player auction for the 2019 Indian Premier League.

On 2 October 2021, Gaikwad scored his first IPL century, with 101 not out against the Rajasthan Royals in the 2021 tournament. On 15 October, Chennai Super Kings beat Kolkata Knight Riders by 27 runs in the finals with Gaikwad contributing to CSK's total by scoring 32 runs off 27 balls. He won the Orange Cap for scoring the most runs (635) in the 2021 tournament and was also awarded the Emerging Player of the Year award.

After his good performances the in the 2021 season, Gaikwad was retained by Chennai Super Kings for ₹6 crores ahead of the 2022 IPL auction.

Chennai Super Kings again Retain Ruturaj Gaikwad in IPL 2023 for ₹6 crore for his performance in domestic cricket.

Personal life 
Gaikwad lives in the Sangvi area of Pimpri-Chinchwad in Pune. He is originally from Pargaon Memane. His father Dasharath Gaikwad worked in the Indian Army.

References

External links
 

1997 births
Living people
Indian cricketers
India Twenty20 International cricketers
India One Day International cricketers
Chennai Super Kings cricketers
Maharashtra cricketers
Cricketers from Pune